HMS Berkeley was a Type I  of the Royal Navy.

Construction
Berkeley was ordered from Cammell Laird in the 1939 Build Programme and laid down on 8 June 1939 as No. J3302. She was launched on 29 January 1940 and commissioned on 6 June 1940.

Career 

Berkeley participated in Operation Aerial, the evacuation of the remnants of the British Expeditionary Force from ports in western France. She was made available to Paul Reynaud and the French government for conferences with Churchill. After the Fall of France, she evacuated the remaining British embassy staff as well as Władysław Raczkiewicz and Polish and Czech troops.

In August 1940, Berkeley escorted minelayers during minelaying Operation SN32. She spent September on anti-invasion patrols in the English Channel. She escorted convoys in October and November. On 20 December 1940, she was damaged by a mine in the Medway and was repaired at  Chatham Dockyard.

After the repairs were completed, Berkeley resumed convoy escort duties in January 1941. On 22 February, she escorted  during the minelaying Operation JK off the French coast. For the rest of the year, Berkeley escorted convoys and patrolled the English Channel. In February 1942, she participated in the unsuccessful attempt to intercept the German battleships  and  during the Channel Dash. Lieutenant James Yorke became her commander on 27 March 1942. Berkeley continued convoy escort duties until July 1942, when she was selected to be part of the naval force supporting Operation Jubilee. On 18 August 1942, Berkeley escorted the Dieppe raiding force. During a 19 August air attack, she was hit by two bombs dropped from Focke-Wulf Fw 190s, which broke her keel and killed 13 ratings. As the damage was beyond control, she was abandoned and then scuttled by torpedoes from the escort destroyer .

References

Publications

 
 

 

1940 ships
Destroyers sunk by aircraft
Hunt-class destroyers of the Royal Navy
Maritime incidents in August 1942
Ships built on the River Mersey
Ships sunk by German aircraft
Shipwrecks in the English Channel